ROKS Hyang Ro Bong (LST-683) is a  in the Republic of Korea Navy.

Construction and commissioning 
The ship was launched in 1996 by Hanjin Heavy Industries at Busan and commissioned into the Navy in 1999.

She participated in the 70th Anniversary of the Navy in 2015.

References

Ships built by Hanjin Heavy Industries
Go Jun Bong-class tank landing ships
1996 ships